Liu Chuang (born 27 December 1974) is a Chinese judoka. She competed in the women's lightweight event at the 1996 Summer Olympics.

References

1974 births
Living people
Chinese female judoka
Olympic judoka of China
Judoka at the 1996 Summer Olympics
Place of birth missing (living people)
Asian Games medalists in judo
Judoka at the 1994 Asian Games
Asian Games bronze medalists for China
Medalists at the 1994 Asian Games
20th-century Chinese women
21st-century Chinese women